Maghrebi mint tea (Maghrebi Arabic: , atay;), also known as Moroccan mint tea and Algerian mint tea, is a North African green tea prepared with spearmint leaves and sugar. 

It is traditional to the Greater Maghreb region (the northwest African countries of Morocco, Algeria, Tunisia, Libya, and Mauritania). Its consumption has spread throughout North Africa, parts of the Sahel, France, Spain, the Arab world, and Middle East. 

Mint tea is central to social life in the Maghreb. and is very popular among the Tuareg people of Algeria, Libya, Niger and Mali. The serving can take a ceremonial form, especially when prepared for a guest. The tea is traditionally made by the head male in the family and offered to guests as a sign of hospitality. Typically, at least three glasses of tea are served. The tea is consumed throughout the day as a social activity. The native spearmint naʿnāʿ possesses a clear, pungent, mild aroma, and is the mint that is traditionally used in Maghrebi mint tea. Other hybrids and cultivars of spearmint, including yerba buena, are occasionally used as substitutes for Nana mint. In Morocco, mint tea is sometimes perfumed with herbs, flowers, or orange blossom water. In the cold season, they add many warming herbs like pennyroyal mint and wormwood. Mint has been used as an infusion, decoction, and herbal medicine throughout the Mediterranean since Antiquity. This aromatic plant was widely used in Algeria to cure and prevent cholera when it plagued the country from 1835 until 1865.

History
Gunpowder tea was introduced into North Africa by the British in the 18th and 19th centuries via Morocco and Algeria. 

According to food historian, Helen Saberi, the drinking of green tea infused with mint spread from Morocco to Algeria, Tunisia, Libya, Egypt and to nomadic tribes of Berbers and Tuareg in the Sahara.

Sugar and tea would arrive from Europe to the port of Essaouira, where Jewish merchants who had started migrating to coastal cities in the 19th century managed their passing through the interior of Morocco. James Richardson recorded a description of a Moroccan tea ceremony in the 1840s, and said that during his travels tea was drunk widely and all day long. 

In the twenty years after the Anglo-Moroccan Treaty of 1856, and after the British East India Company diverted tea meant for the Baltic states to Morocco during the Crimean War, tea imports quadrupled but tea consumption remained an urban practice. Tea consumption spread through wider segments of the population as a result of the famines of the 1880s, when it became an emergency calorie substitute, appetite suppressant, and mode of performing acculturation for rural populations flooding the cities in search of opportunities.

Another factor in the spread of atay consumption in Morocco was the comparative scarcity of coffee. Whereas Algerian cities had been introduced to coffee culture under the influence of the Ottomans, Moroccan cities would only be introduced to coffee later. Oral traditions in the Algerian city of Tlemcen distinguish between "Fassi tea drinkers and Tlemceni coffee drinkers."

In the late 19th century, Sufi orders led by figures such as Muhammad Bin Abdul-Kabir Al-Kattani told their adherents not to drink tea, attempting to boycott sugar and tea imported by Europeans.

By the early 20th century, mint tea had become well established in Morocco.

Preparation

The basic ingredients of the tea are green tea, fresh mint leaves, sugar, and boiling water. The proportions of the ingredients and the brewing time can vary widely. Boiling water is used in the Maghreb, rather than the cooler water that is used in East Asia to avoid bitterness. The leaves are left in the pot while the tea is consumed, changing the flavor from one glass to the next.

It is poured into glasses from high above to swirl loose tea leaves to the bottom of the glass, whilst gently aerating the tea to improve its flavor.

In the winter, if mint is rare, sometimes leaves of tree wormwood ( chiba or sheeba in Moroccan dialect) are substituted for (or used to complement) the mint, giving the tea a distinctly bitter flavor. Lemon verbena ( lwiza in Moroccan Arabic) is also used to give it a lemon flavor. Other herbs used to flavor the tea include oregano, sage, and thyme. The tea is sometimes sold as a ready-to-cook mixture of tea and dried mint, which is easier to store and to prepare but has diminished flavor. 

A simple and practical method runs as follows:
 In a teapot, combine two teaspoons of tea-leaf with a half liter of boiling water. Allow it to steep for at least 15 minutes.
 Without stirring, filter the mixture into a stainless steel pot, so that the tea leaves and coarse powder are removed.
 Add sugar (about one teaspoon per 100 milliliters).
 Bring to boil over a medium heat (this helps the sugar dissolve).
 Fresh mint leaves can be added to the teapot, or directly to the cup.

A more complex method is as follows:

The tea is first put in the teapot and a small quantity of boiling water is added. The tea is left to infuse for approximately 20–30 seconds. This initial liquid is poured out and kept aside. This is the "spirit" of the tea and will be added back after the tea is washed, to restore the "spirit" (the "spirit" of the tea is essentially a strong, deeply flavored liquid from the initial infusion, which adds extra flavor to the final infusion). The tea is then "cleaned" by adding a small quantity of boiling water; that is poured out after one minute (to lessen the bitterness). This process may be repeated more than once. Mint and sugar are added (amounts vary; approximately five teaspoons of sugar for one teaspoon of tea leaves is typical), and water at the boiling point is then poured in the pot. The pot may then be taken to heat and further boiled to increase the flavor of the infusion. After three to five minutes, a glass is served and poured back in the pot two to three times to mix the tea. Tea is then tasted (sugar if needed may be added) until the infusion is fully developed.

Traditionally, the tea is served three times. The amount of time it has been steeping gives each of the glasses of tea a unique flavor, described in this famous Maghrebi proverb:

The first glass is as gentle as life,the second is as strong as love,the third is as bitter as death.

In popular culture
In one of Nass El Ghiwane's most popular songs, Es-Siniya, the tea tray is used as a metaphor to discuss the hardships of migrating from the countryside to a big city such as Casablanca.

See also
 Arabic tea
 Algerian cuisine
 Tunisian cuisine
 Moroccan cuisine
 Libyan cuisine
 Libyan tea
 Tea culture

References 

Blended tea
Green tea
North African cuisine
Sephardi Jewish cuisine
Tea culture
Tea in Africa
Algerian cuisine
African cuisine
Algerian drinks
African drinks
Tuareg culture